The Calumet Fire Station is a firehouse located on 6th Street in Calumet, Michigan.  It is also known as the Red Jacket Fire Station.  The building was designated a Michigan State Historic Site in 1971 and listed on the National Register of Historic Places in 1974, and is part of the Calumet Historic District and the Keweenaw National Historical Park.  The building now houses the Upper Peninsula Fire Fighters Memorial Museum.

History 
At the turn of the twentieth century, the threat of fire was constant in what was then a prosperous mining town.  The construction of the fire station was started in 1898 and completed in 1899, using plans made by architect C. K. Shand.  Although the station was built by the village of Calumet (then "Red Jacket"), the lot on which it sits was leased from the Calumet and Hecla Mining Company until 1910, when the company deeded it to the village.  The total cost of the building at the time was just over $20,000, including architectural work, stonework, and carpentry.

In 1964, the fire department moved to the town hall building.  The building was used in various ways, including rooms for summer repertory performers at the nearby Calumet Theatre.  It now houses the Upper Peninsula Fire Fighters Memorial Museum.

Description 
The Calumet Fire Station is a two-story Richardsonian Romanesque building, rectangular in plan and measuring fifty-four feet by eighty-three feet.  It is constructed of red sandstone. Three fire engine entrances with wooden doors are in the center of the front facade.  The doors are topped by a stepped gable which is flanked by a smaller gable on one side and an open bell tower with a pyramidal roof sits the other.  The roof of the structure is flat.  Small doors are in each of the other three sides.

The building was originally constructed with the first floor housing fire engines and horses, with other equipment in the basement.  The second floor primarily housed the fire fighters, but also held hay for the horses.  The firemen's quarters included a bunk room, locker room, and a larger hall for social affairs.

References

External links
Information about the Upper Peninsula Firefighter's Memorial Museum

Buildings and structures in Houghton County, Michigan
National Register of Historic Places in Keweenaw National Historical Park
Fire stations completed in 1898
Fire stations on the National Register of Historic Places in Michigan
Defunct fire stations in Michigan
Historic district contributing properties in Michigan
Michigan State Historic Sites in Houghton County
Richardsonian Romanesque architecture in Michigan
National Register of Historic Places in Houghton County, Michigan